This is a complete and up to date list of every creative team that has competed in Zuda, DC Comic's webcomic imprint, thus far.

Instant winners
 Bayou by Jeremy Love
 The Night Owls by Peter Timony and Bobby Timony
 Street-Code by Dean Haspiel
 The Imaginary Boys by Carlos López Bermúdez
 I Rule The Night by Kevin Colden
 Bottle of Awesome by Andy Belanger and Ian Herring
 La Morté Sisters by Tony Trov, Johnny Zito & Christine Larsen

2007 competitions

November 2007
The first set of contestants was announced on Newsarama:
 Alpha Monkey by Bobbie Rubio and Howard M. Shum
 This American Strife by J. Longo
 Battlefield Babysitter by Matthew Humphreys
 Black Swan by Mulele Jarvis
 Dead in the Now by Corey Lewis
 The Dead Seas by Pop Mhan
 The Enders by Tim Smith III
 High Moon by David Gallaher and Steve Ellis (winner)
 Leprenomicon by Greg DelCurla and Fernando Ruiz
 Raining Cats and Dogs by Sho Murase

December 2007
 Adventures of Maxy J Millionaire by Paul Maybury
 Araknid Kid by Josh Alves
 Avast Ye by Kevin Cygan and Daniel H. Irving
 Development Hell by Carlos Ruiz
 Frankie by Manny Trembley
 Ponbiki Z by Alberto Rios
 Pray for Death by Nicholas Doan and Daniele Serra (winner)
 The Crooked Man by  Gabriel Hardman and Corinna Sara Bechko
 The Mundane Overrated Misadventures of Spudman by Rory McConville
 Word of Power by Marc Sylvanus

2008 competitions

January 2008
As announced on Newsarama:
 A Spelunker's Guide to the City by Gary Epting
 Untrue Tales by Sam Little
 Urbis Faerie by Robert Burke Richardson, Martin Morazzo, Carolina Cesare, Robt Snyder
 Supertron by Sheldon Vella (winner)
 Thomas: Agent of Chaos by L. Jamal Walton (writer/letterer), Mike Imboden (writer) and Steve Musgrave (artist)
 Pieces of Eden by Seth Sherwood (writer/colorist) and Diego Tripodi (artist)
 The Legend of the Fool King by Alexander Kanaris-Sotiriou
 Demons in the Closet by John Zakour (writer) and Amy Watson (artist)
 Danetropolis by David Daneman
 Absurdity At Its Best by Victor Bonilla

February 2008
As announced on Newsarama:
 Everyone Laughs at the Crocodile Man by Steve Steiner
 Joe Comics by Chachi & Gabe Hernandez
 Mountains of Dusk by Mani Magalhaes
 The Passenger by Alexandre Vidal
 Reno by Dan Thompson
 Road by Eddie Sharam (winner)
 Starfish by Miguel Angel Sanchez
 Strangle/Switch by Kevin Colden
 Teachers by Gabe Ostley
 Will Wrestle: For Science by Jim Dedieu, Geoff Beaulieu, & Alex Donnard

March 2008
As announced on Newsarama:
 Among the Silver Stars by Chris Wichtendahl & Ariel Iacci
 The Black Cherry Bombshells by Johnny Zito, Tony Trov, Sacha Borisich & Alex Bruno (winner)
 Day of Prey by Ramon Cavalcante
 Laura’s Bazaar by Axel Medellin
 The Litterbox Chronicles by Wes Molebash
 Little Inventor' by Igor Noronha
 Rojo Fernandez: Son of Wind by Gabriel Bautista
 Sam & Lilah by Jim Dougan & Hyeondo Park
 Tiempo by Mario Espinoza
 Yuletide by Tony Tobin

April 2008
 Agent Happydeath by Spencer Platt
 Suckerpunch by Russel Paul Daff
 Feuerkind by Steven Michael Robert Wilbur
 Streetpunx by Leon Govender
 Punchboys by Ahmad Rashad Doucet
 Super Seed by Tyler James Vogel
 Melody by Ilias Kyriazis (winner)
 The Erebus Effect by Henry Espiritu, Ravuth Vann

May 2008
 Action, Ohio by Neil Kleid
 E by Kerry P. Talbott
 Hannibal Goes to Rome by Brendan McGinley and Mauro Vargas
 Celadore by Canaan Grall (winner)
 Children of Bighand by Rudy Dean Guara
 Golden by Troy Bowen
 Colonel McTaggart by Steve Steiner
 The Mean Model by Charlie Podrebarac
 Robodeath by Azurek Studios

June 2008
 Dual by Michael Walton (winner)
 Cursed Planet by R.G. Llarena
 Sam P.I. by John Zakour
 Mister Crimson by Seth M. Sherwood and Diego Tripodi
 Love, Lust, and a Giant Turtle by Neil Holan
 Psychopath: A Love Story by Matthew Petz
 Mime by Manny Trembly
 S. Type by Alexander Diochon
 Red Ice by Scott O. Brown
 Sharks+Shrinks by Gary Epting

July 2008: Zuda Invitational
 Joe Comics by Gabe Hernandez and Chachi Hernandez
 Dead in the Now by Corey Lewis
 The Mundane Overrated Misadventures of Spudman by Rory McConville
 Re-Evolution by Gustavo Higuera (winner)
 The Crooked Man by Gabriel Hardman and Corinna Sara Bechko
 Teachers by Gabriel Mark Ostley
 Araknid Kid by Josh Alves
 Brave Ulysses' by Adam C. Moore
 Untrue Tales by Sam Little
 Reno by Daniel J. Thompson

August 2008
 Gulch by Matt White and Gabe White (winner)
 Furiku Buredu by Jim Dedieu
 Vic Boone by Shawn Aldridge and Jeff Winstead
 The Harvest War by Kevin Manklow and Andrew Egan
 Junk by Justin Jordan and Sami Makkonen
 Shock Effect by John Lang and Ian Daffern
 To The Red Country by Philip Willey
 The Adventures of Rocki Gilbraltar by Brendon Fraim and Brian Fraim
 Rhandom Escape by Matthew Daniel Loux
 The Stuffed Animal Sagas by Tom Kelley

September 2008
 Unconscious Life by Anthony Peruzzo
 Blood Hunter by Loren Meyer (winner)
 Problems by Alexander Diochon
 Middle-Aged Monster by Steve Steiner
 My Daddy's a Super-Villain by Scott O. Brown and Jamie Roberts
 Dash Steel: Freelance Adventurer by William Orr
 My Pet Human by Harry Pujols
 The Fighting Stranger by Adam J. Monetta
 Janggar: Son of the Steppe by Steve Bialik
 Hopeless Youth by Jesse Hanna

October 2008
Guest judges: Bobby Timony and Peter Timony
 Mathema by Amy Pearson
 Hammer Sound by Evan Bryce and Doug Wagner
 Azure by Daniel Govar (winner)
 Alone by Daniel Furman
 Terrestrial by BW Swartz
 World of Chi: Chronicles by Lewis Walker
 Path Nine by Dan Pevar
 Azurius Pluma by Gabriel Bautista Jr.
 Skullgoyle by Dan Taylor
 Ladybug Murders by Paul Salvi

November 2008
 Daily Comic by Chuck Harrison
 Extracurricular Activities by Rory McConville (winner)
 Screaming Eagles by Michael San Giacomo
 Baby Monsters by Steve Broom
 Blood Covenant: Revelations by Lucky Herman Tjandra
 Hijos de P by Amancay Nicolas Nahuelpan Bustamante
 Marshall by Andres Barrero and Felipe Martinez
 Planet X by Trey Causey
 Rumors of War by Justin Jordan and John Bivens
 Work is Not in Progress by Diego Borriello

December 2008
 A Single Soul by Nancy Leslie and Daniel Furman
 Aeon of the Dead (now Devil's Wake) by Dean Hsieh (winner)
 Angus Frump Kills Christmas by Steve Bialik
 Bleed by Adam Atherton and Luiza Dragonescu
 Caztar by Luc Poets
 Hellbreak by Radek Smektala and Janusz Ordon
 Non-Exertus 12 by Spencer Platt
 Juliette: Worst Vampire Ever by Cedric Poulat
 The Accountants by Rob Osbourne
 Tri-Boro Tales by Keith Miller and Chuck Collins

2009 competitions

January 2009
 Lasers Dragons and Lies by John Zakour and John Dallaire
 Legacy of the Wanderer by Mark Cecere and Randy Humphries
 Lifespan by Shannon Cronin and Christopher Steininger
 Love the Dango! by Amber D. Stone
 Maladroits by Glen Walker
 Project: WarHawk by Dan Thompson
 Safe Inside by Zerocalcare (winner)
 Sea Dogs of Mars by Christopher John Beck and Keri Woodward
 The Devil's Cross by Antonio Vazquez Galvez and Ana Belen Nuñez Villalta
 We Make Clouds by Michael Farah and J. Longo

February 2009
 Azz's Inferno by Thane Benson
 Doctor Immortalis by Jason D and Michael Nelsen of 50 Foot Robot Studios
 Fire and Water by Federica Manfredi
 Gravedust by Jeff Mason
 Indie by Jericho Vilar
 Ninjas from Ibiza: Clubbin' to Death by Francesco Biagini
 Operation: Nazi U by Kevin Dzuban
 Part-Time Magic by Greg Kinman
 Splitting Atoms by Siddharth Kotian
 The Hammer by Sam Little, Gabe Ostley, Rob Berry, and Steve Steiner (winner)

March 2009
 Children of Armageddon by Chris Meeks
 Deadly by James Fosdike (winner)
 Doorman Bill by Diego Flavio Tripodi
 Dracula vs. Santa by Melissa DeJesus and Ed Power
 Kharon: Scourge of Atlantis by Jim Shelley and Pierre Villeneuve
 Lani, The Leopard Queen by Geof Isherwood
 Maintaining Bohemia by Buster Moody and Harold Sipe
 Panda Force by Sean Causley
 The Dirty Mile by James Smith III
 The Rejects by Nate Frisoli and Walter Ostlie

April 2009
 Cancer Troop 4 by Gabriel Bautista
 Earthbuilders by Axel Medellin Machain (winner)
 Intergalactic Law: Grey Squad by Lisa Fary & John Dallaire
 Mecha-Simian by Rich Lovatt
 Myth by Michael Loniewski
 Pirate Eye by Robert Gervais
 Spy6teen by Tim Simmons
 The Kind You Don't Bring Home to Mother by Ryan Estrada
 The Rise and Fall of the Penguin by Harry Pujols

May 2009
 Amber Hale, Supermodel by Daren Strange, Lewis Walker & Josh Howard
 Beertown B'hoys by Steve Bialik
 Clandestino by Amancay Nicolas Nahuelpan Bustamante
 Cubicles by Walter Christopher Ostlie
 Flowing Wells by Andrew Dimitt
 Freak City by Mackenzie Michael Schubert
 Gone Zombie by Stephen Thor
 Lily of the Valley by Adam Atherton & Luiza Dragonescu (winner)
 OPSEC by James Alexander Bott & Dean
 Sides by Alexander Diochon

June 2009
 Fallen Hunter by Wai Kwong Chan
 Kogoshii by Danny Donovan and Gigi
 Quick by Thane Frederick Benson
 Scarecrow Spookshow by Aidan Casserly
 Sidewise by Dwight L. MacPherson and Igor Noronha (winner)
 Sketch Me, Deadly by David Gerard Miley
 Small Lives by Marco Palombelli
 The Corpse Carries A Gun by Matthew Petz
 The Last Werewolf by SEDNA-STUDIO
 The Urban Adventures of Melvin Blank by Bill Williams and Thom Zahler

July 2009
 9th Year by Alberto Lanzillotti & Manuel Bracchi
 Assignment by Anthony Peruzzo & Justin Jordan
 Bloody Pulp by Jeff McComsey & Jorge Vega
 Children's Games by Erik Valdez y Alanis
 Interrogation Control Element by Tyler James, Damian Couceiro, Paul John Little & Steve D Forbes
 Metropolitan Siege by Eric & Chris Zawadzki
 RockStar by Aluísio Cervelle Santos (winner)
 The Adventures of Mr. Simian by John Bivens
 The Ares Imperative by Steve Ekstrom, Mikael Bergkvist & Jesse Turnbull
 Vigilante Granny by Don Kunkel, Rian Miller & CPWilsonIII

August 2009
 A Stinking Corpse  by Daniel Furman
 Absolute Magnitude by Robert Burke Richardson, Martin Morazzo & chinadoll (winner)
 Antique Books by Scott Boyce
 Arctic by 00ghost00
 Bow & Arrow Detective Agency by George Gousis &  Antonis Vavagiannis
 Cards Kill by Jason Chiu & Leah Liu Robekka Art Studio
 If You See The Hills by Sal Field
 Octane Jungle by Morgan Luthi & Mike L. Kinshella
 Physikon by Alexander Drummond Diochon
 Rogue Royal by Chris Garret

September 2009
 Goldilock by Adam Lucas (winner)
 Zamir by Pablo Zych
 WheelJack Union by Mike Odum
 The Symptoms by William Sliney & Dave Hendrick
 Marked by Fernando Pinto
 Revenge of the Homicidal Pumpkins by Shannon Cronin, Iwan Nazif & Lisa Moore
 Incarna by David Gunawan
 Tessyleia 2.0 by Marc Borstel
 Mystery Jungle by Diego Cordoba
 My T-Shirt Fairy Tale by Adrian Ramos

October 2009
 Pluck by Gabe White, John Amor & Matt White (Winner)
 Where Evils Dare by Tony Lee & Stefano Martino
 Doc Monster by David Flora
 Evil Ain't Easy by Seth Wolfshorndl
 Impure Blood by Nathan Lueth & Nadja Baer
 ShockPopTerror! by Jean-Michel Ringuet
 A Polar Nightmare by Amancay Nicolas Nahuelpan Bustamante
 Old Cthulhu's On The Rise by Daniel Tollin
 Fly Me From The Moon by Gabriel Bautista
 Blitz by Ted Dawson

November 2009
 In Maps & Legends by Niki Smith and Michael Jasper (Winner)
 Children of the Sewer by Benito Gallego (the best)
 Peabody & D'Gorath by Mark D Penman
 Model Student by Joe Bowen
 Little Earth People by Christopher Lewis and Joe Pekar
 Brother of Bronze Hammer by Andrew Alexander
 Slam McCracken by Greg Woronchak
 Big Ups: A Space Adventure by Christina Boyce and Justin King
 Molly and the Amazing Door Tree by Mark Murphy
 Witch Phase by Bryan Golden

December 2009
 One Hit Knock Out by Maximo V. Lorenzo (Winner)
 Villain by Gregory Smallwood
 Unseen Tribe by Luciano Vecchio
 The House Always Wins by Josh Hechinger and John Bivens
 SubSuelo by Alfredo Rodríguez and Gabriel Rodríguez
 Ayanna by Wai Kwong Chan
 Mark Wolfchild by Li Shi Peng and David LeVack
 Daemon's Sphere by Andrew Hartmann and Gill Saxon
 Goop Jr. by Mike Robinson
 Jason and the Argonauts Redux by Barry Keegan

2010 competitions

January 2010
 Beyond The Borderlands by Brian McLachlan
 Candy From Strangers by Jim Rodgers and Byron Jackson
 Iron Sam by David Dumeer
 NewBot by Chuck Harrison
 Pavlov's Dream by Shari Chankhamma and Bicyclefish
 Phantom Sword by Nick Edwards
 Road Monster by Nicolás Raúl Sánchez Brondo and Diego Cortés
 The Thunderchickens by William Dean Blankenship Jr. and Chad Boudreau
 War Of The Fallen by Quinton J. Bedwell
 War Of The Woods by Matthew Petz

References

External links
 All competitors at ZudaComics.com

Zuda